Ultimate Collection is a 1999 compilation of songs by the band the Fixx. It is largely a collection of singles; many tracks appear as they did on their respective 7" releases. It also has two B-sides and one recording pulled from the rare Happy Landings EP, which makes it stand out from other greatest hits collections. This is the only Fixx collection to use the original recordings of all tracks.

Track listing
"Stand or Fall" – 4:00
"Red Skies" – 4:20
"Lost Planes" – 3:19
"Some People" – 3:00
 Tracks 1-4 from Shuttered Room
"Saved by Zero" – 3:23 (single edit)
"One Thing Leads to Another" – 3:24 (single mix)
"The Sign of Fire" – 3:51
 Tracks 5-7 from Reach the Beach
"Going Overboard" – 3:16
 B-side to "Saved by Zero"
"Deeper and Deeper [long version]" – 6:29
 From the soundtrack to the motion picture Streets of Fire, this version appeared on the B-side to "Are We Ourselves?".
"Are We Ourselves?" – 2:28
"Sunshine in the Shade" – 2:26
"Less Cities, More Moving People" – 3:35 (single edit)
 Tracks 10-12 from Phantoms
"A Letter to Both Sides" – 3:19
 From the soundtrack to the motion picture Fletch
"Secret Separation" – 3:49
"Built for the Future" – 3:54 (single edit)
 Tracks 14 & 15 from Walkabout
"Driven Out" – 3:58 (From Calm Animals)
"How Much Is Enough" – 3:50 (single edit)
"No One Has to Cry" – 4:01
 Tracks 17 & 18 from Ink
"Two Different Views" – 5:49 (From the Happy Landings EP)

References

The Fixx albums
1999 compilation albums